The Wando were a tribe of Native Americans of the Cusabo group who lived in South Carolina on the banks of the Cooper River.

Their name is also spelled Wandoe. Another Cusabo tribe, the Etiwaw, lived on the Wando River.

Language 
The Cusabo language is unattested.

History 
Spaniards explored Charleston Harbor in 1605. English colonists settled near Wando territory in 1670. 

In 1675, the Wando, along with their neighbors, the Etiwan, Sampa, and Sewee petitioned English settler Maurice Mathews asked for land to be reserved for their settled. The colonial council established land for these tribes to settle near Charleston Harbor, and the Wando and Sewee settled on the southern bankds of the Wando River.

The Sewee people lost the majority of their men to an ill-fated ocean voyage, in which they planned to travel to England, but instead were caught in a storm. Survivors were saved by British vessels only to be sold into slavery in the Caribbean. The remaining Sewee moved in with and intermarried with the Wando people.

Swanton surmises that the Wando merged into their neighboring peoples.

Legacy 
The Wando River was named for the tribe.
The United States Navy tug USS Wando, in commission from 1917–1922 and 1933–1946, was named for them. Wando High School is also named for them.

Notes

References

External links 
 SCIWAY: Wando Indians - Native Americans in SC

Extinct Native American tribes
History of Charleston, South Carolina
Native American history of South Carolina
Native American tribes in South Carolina